Gatton–Clifton Road is a continuous  road route in the Lockyer Valley and Toowoomba regions of Queensland, Australia. Most of the road is signed as State Route 80. Gatton–Clifton Road (number 313) is a state-controlled  road, part regional and part district. The district part is rated as a local road of regional significance (LRRS).

Route Description
It passes the exit to Mount Sylvia Road as it leaves Winwill. Land use along this section of the road is irrigated crops. From here it runs through  and reaches the foothills of the Great Dividing Range.

The road follows a winding, scenic route as it climbs the range, passing through native forest. In Hirstglen it passes the exit  to Greenmount–Hirstvale Road. From the top of the range it enters open farming country, passing through  and reaching the New England Highway. There State Route 80 ends, and Gatton–Clifton Road turns south on the highway. After  it exits to the west with no route number. It enters  as East Street, and crosses the railway line before reaching an intersection with King Street. The road ends here, with Felton–Clifton Road running north as King Street.

In Fordsdale the road crosses Heifer Creek, where there is a popular camping area. From there it follows the creek to Hirstglen, which is why it is unofficially known as Heifer Creek Road.

Gatton–Helidon Road

Gatton–Helidon Road is a state-controlled road (number 314), part regional and part district. The district part is rated as a local road of regional significance (LRRS). Part of it is part of State Route 80, and all of it is part of the Warrego Way. It is part of the former route of the Warrego Highway through Gatton.

A project to widen multiple high-speed sections of Gatton–Helidon Road, at a cost of $4.6 million, was expected to be completed in June 2022.

State Route 80
State Route 80 starts at an intersection with the Warrego Highway in the north-eastern corner of Gatton. It follows the former route of the highway through Gatton, which becomes Gatton-Helidon Road. It turns south-west onto Gatton–Clifton Road and follows it to the New England Highway at Clifton.

Warrego Way
It leaves the highway in the north-eastern corner of Gatton and follows the former route of the highway. This becomes Gatton–Helidon Road, which it follows to  where it rejoins the highway.

Road condition
Gatton–Clifton Road is fully sealed.

History

Gatton was gazetted as a settlement in 1855, and the railway arrived in 1866. With the arrival of the railway the town expanded quickly as a commercial centre for the surrounding district. The Tenthill pastoral run was established in 1845, and settlement in the rich Ma Ma Creek valley occurred as land became available. Road construction occurred as settlement expanded towards the foot of the range.

The Clifton pastoral run was established about 1844, and the Pilton run, originally part of Clifton, was separately established in the 1840s. Headington Hill was a large freehold estate established in the 1840s. The first road was cut to service these properties. In 1877,  were resumed from the Clifton pastoral run and offered for selection on 17 April 1877. Subsequent development of small farms to the north of Clifton led to road improvements.

Many factors had led to its construction; among them was reduced travel time between Gatton and Clifton, and a less steep ascent / descent than on the Toowoomba range crossing.

Major intersections
All distances are from Google Maps.

See also

 List of road routes in Queensland
 List of numbered roads in Queensland

Notes

References

Roads in Queensland